The Karachi American School (KAS), formerly known as Karachi American Society School, is a preschool to Grade 13 day school located in Karachi, Sindh, Pakistan.

History
The school was founded in 1952 as Karachi American Society School with funding from the U.S. Government.

Formerly, it was known as the International School of Karachi. It is considered an elite school of Karachi.

In August 2017, the school expanded its offerings and founded a college called Karachi American College.

Alumni

 Yasin Anwar
 Fatima Bhutto
 Fauzia Kasuri
 Mir Ibrahim Rahman
 Tina Sani

See also

Americans in Pakistan
VonHayat School

References

External links
Official Site

American international schools in Pakistan
International schools in Karachi
Private schools in Pakistan
1952 establishments in Pakistan